Agrícola Oriental is a metro station on Line A of the Mexico City Metro system. It is located in the  Iztacalco municipality. In 2019, the station had an average ridership of 11,317 passengers per day, making it the least used station in Line A.

Name and pictogram
The station is named for the neighborhood it lies in: the colonia Agrícola Oriental, a mixed-use neighborhood in eastern Mexico City. The name "agrícola" translates to agricultural; therefore, the station's pictogram depicts two spikes of wheat.

General information
The station opened on 12 August 1991 along with the other stations on Line A.

Like every Line A station, except for Pantitlán, it is an at-grade station in the median of Calzada Ignacio Zaragoza with the entrances on both sides of the road connecting to the station through two pedestrian bridges. The station is near the intersection of Calle 1 in Colonia Agrícola Oriental of Iztacalco borough. It lies to the east of the Autódromo Hermanos Rodríguez.

From 23 April to 25 June 2020, the station was temporarily closed due to the COVID-19 pandemic in Mexico.

Ridership

Exits
North: Calzada Ignacio Zaragoza and Calle 1, Colonia Agrícola Oriental
South: Eje 5 Oriente Avenida Central and Calzada Ignacio Zaragoza, Colonia Agrícola Oriental

Station layout

Gallery

References

External links

Mexico City Metro Line A stations
Railway stations opened in 1991
1991 establishments in Mexico
Mexico City Metro stations in Iztacalco